Acanthocladium dockeri is a critically endangered species of the family Asteraceae that belongs to the monotypic genus Acanthocladium. It is commonly known as spiny everlasting or spiny daisy. It is native to Australia, and is found around the South Australian town of Laura.

Description 
The spiny everlasting is a woody perennial shrub with spines at branch ends, covered in short white hair. It bears oblong, bumpy fruit.

Spiny everlasting was presumed extinct in 1992, having suffered habitat loss from clearance for winter crops, but various colonies of it have been found around Laura, near the Spencer Gulf.

Homonym
In 1883, William Mitten used the same name, Acanthocladium, to refer to a group of mosses, now in the family Sematophyllaceae. Several dozen species of mosses were described and place in this genus before it was realized that Mittenn's name represented an illegitimate homonym. The moss genus has since been renamed Wijkia H.A. Crum.

References

Bibliography

Gnaphalieae
Monotypic Asteraceae genera
Flora of South Australia
Taxa named by Ferdinand von Mueller